Melissa Scott (born 1960, in Little Rock, Arkansas) is an American science fiction and fantasy author noted for her science fiction novels featuring LGBT characters and elaborate settings.

Biography
Scott studied history at Harvard College and Brandeis University, and earned her PhD in comparative history.  She published her first novel in 1984, and has since written some two dozen science fiction and fantasy works, including three co-authored with her partner, Lisa A. Barnett.

Scott's work is known for elaborate and well-constructed settings.  While many of her protagonists are gay, lesbian, bisexual or transgender, critic Phyllis Betz notes that the characters' genders or orientations are rarely a major focus of Scott's stories.  Shadow Man, alone among Scott's works, focuses explicitly on issues of sexuality and gender.

She won the John W. Campbell Award for Best New Writer in Science Fiction in 1986, and has won several Lambda Literary Awards.

In addition to writing, Scott also teaches writing, offering classes via her website and publishing a writing guide.

Scott lived with her partner, author Lisa A. Barnett, in Portsmouth, New Hampshire for 27 years, until the latter's death of breast cancer on May 2, 2006.

Bibliography

 The Game Beyond, 1984
 The Silence Leigh trilogy
 Five-Twelfths of Heaven, 1985
 Silence in Solitude, 1986
 The Empress of Earth, 1987
 A Choice of Destinies, 1986
 The Kindly Ones, 1987
 The Armor of Light, with Lisa A. Barnett, 1988
 Mighty Good Road, 1990
 Dreamships, 1992
 Burning Bright, 1993
 Trouble and Her Friends, 1994
 Shadow Man, 1996
 Night Sky Mine, 1996
 Dreaming Metal, 1997, a continuation from Dreamships
 The Shapes of Their Hearts, 1998
 The Jazz, 2000
 Astreiant
 Point of Hopes, with Lisa A. Barnett, 1995
 Point of Dreams, with Lisa A. Barnett, 2001
 Point of Knives, 2012
 Fairs' Point, 2014
 Point of Sighs, 2018
 The Order of the Air
 Lost Things, with Jo Graham, 2012
 Steel Blues, with Jo Graham, 2013
 Silver Bullet, with Jo Graham, 2014
 Wind Raker, with Jo Graham, 2015
 Oath Bound, with Jo Graham, 2015
 Julian Lynes and Ned Mathey
 Death by Silver, with Amy Griswold, 2013
 A Death at the Dionysus Club, with Amy Griswold, 2014
 Firstborn, Lastborn
 Finders, 2018
 Novels based in the Star Trek universe
 Proud Helios (Star Trek: Deep Space Nine)
 The Garden (Star Trek: Voyager)
Novels based in the Stargate Atlantis universe
 Homecoming, with Jo Graham, 2010 (book 1 of the Legacy series)
 Allegiance, with Amy Griswold, 2011 (book 3 of the Legacy Series)
 Secrets, with Jo Graham, 2012 (book 5 of the Legacy Series)
 The Inheritors, with Jo Graham, 2013 (book 6 of the Legacy Series)
 Third Path, 2015 (book 8 of the Legacy Series)
Novels based in the Stargate SG-1 universe
 Moebius Squared, with Jo Graham, 2012
 Ouroboros, 2013
 Novels based on gen:Lock
 Storm Warning 2020

Nonfiction
 Conceiving the Heavens: Creating the Science Fiction Novel (1997)

References

External links
 
 Melissa Scott's current blog/website
 Melissa Scott's old blog
 Melissa Scott's older blog

1960 births
20th-century American novelists
21st-century American novelists
20th-century American women writers
21st-century American women writers
American fantasy writers
American science fiction writers
Cyberpunk writers
American women novelists
Harvard College alumni
Brandeis University alumni
Lambda Literary Award winners
John W. Campbell Award for Best New Writer winners
American lesbian writers
LGBT people from Arkansas
Living people
Writers from Little Rock, Arkansas
American LGBT novelists
Women science fiction and fantasy writers